The holdings of the Islamic Studies Library, a branch of the McGill University Library, stand together with those of the Robarts Library of the University of Toronto as the premier library resources in Canada for research on the Islamic world and among the most important collections in North America.

History
The Islamic Studies library was founded, along with the McGill University Institute of Islamic Studies, in 1952.  It has grown from a modest departmental library to a respectable library of approximately 150,000 volumes covering the whole of Islamic civilization. The library is located in Morrice Hall, designed by John J. Browne, and built in 1882.

Collection
The library collections comprise material in print, manuscript, and audiovisual formats. The manuscript collection consists of approximately 640 volumes of literature in Arabic, Persian, Turkish (including Ottoman Turkish) and Urdu. These holdings are located in  Rare Books and Special Collections The audiovisual resources consist of microfilms of rare books, and manuscripts (535 reels). Among the printed books there is a collection of approximately 3000 rare items, including a collection of 700 volumes of Arabic, Persian, Urdu and Turkish books printed by lithography.

In general terms, the collection aspires to cover the entire range of Islamic civilization (Islamicate). Geographically this is meant to include South Asia (Bangladesh, India, Afghanistan, Pakistan, etc.), Southeast Asia (Indonesia, etc.), Central Asia (Kyrgyzstan, Tajikistan, Kazakhstan, Uzbekistan, and Turkmenistan), the Middle East (Iran, Iraq, Saudi Arabia, Palestine, Israel, Syria, Jordan, the United Arab Emirates, Oman, and the Yemen), and North Africa (Egypt, Libya, Tunisia, Algeria, Morocco and the Sudan).

References

External links
Islamic Studies Library

McGill University
Academic libraries in Canada
Libraries in Montreal
Islamic libraries
1952 establishments in Quebec
Libraries established in 1952